The EOS C500 is a digital cinema camera released by Canon in August 2012. The camera is offered with the option of Canon EF or Arri PL mounts.

Camera
The Canon EOS C500 is Canon's second camera to form part of the Canon Cinema EOS line, complementing the previous Canon EOS C300. Notable new features compared to the previous camera are the addition of 4K and QHD motion video capture to the previous HD capture of the C300 and the ability of the C500 to record raw motion video to the Motion RAW format as well as raw still video to Still RAW format.

Specifications
8.85mp  Super-35 CMOS sensor

Outputs EOS Cinema RAW (uncompressed undebayered raw stream)
Frame rate up to 120fps at 4k
Availability: late 2012
Price: MSRP $30,000 USD

References

External links 

C500
Digital movie cameras